The year 1923 was marked, in science fiction, by the following events.

Births and deaths

Births 
 January 12: Pierre Versins, American writer (died 2001)
 April 17: Lloyd Biggle, Jr., American writer (died 2002)
 April 23: Avram Davidson, American writer (died 1993)
 July 12: James E. Gunn, American writer
 July 23: Cyril M. Kornbluth, American writer (died 1958)
 August 20: Henri Bessière, French writer (died 2011)
 November 1: Gordon R. Dickson, American writer (died 2001)

Deaths

Events 
 March: first publication of Weird Tales, American pulp magazine.

Awards 
The main science-fiction Awards known at the present time did not exist at this time.

Literary releases

Novels 
 Aelita, by Aleksey Nikolayevich Tolstoy.
  La Poupée sanglante (The Bloody Doll), by Gaston Leroux.

Stories collections

Short stories

Comics

Audiovisual outputs

Movies

See also 
 1923 in science
 1922 in science fiction
 1924 in science fiction

References

Science fiction by year

science-fiction